The Ford Model F is an automobile produced by Ford. It was a development of the Model A and Model C, but was larger, more modern, and more luxurious. Production started in 1905 and ended in 1906 after about 1,000 were made. It was built at the Ford Piquette Avenue Plant. It was a four-seater phaeton with running boards and a side-entrance tonneau standard. All had green bodies.

Notes

References

External links 
 

Model F
Brass Era vehicles
Cars introduced in 1905
Cars powered by 2-cylinder engines
Cars powered by boxer engines
Motor vehicles manufactured in the United States